A referendum on the new constitution of France was held in New Caledonia on 28 September 1958 as part of a wider referendum held across the French Union. If accepted, the new constitution would see the country become part of the new French Community. If rejected, the referendum would result in independence. It was approved by 98.12% of voters.

Campaign
In August 1958 the leaders of the two main parties, Maurice Lenormand of the Caledonian Union and Georges Chatenay of the National Centre of Social Republicans, met French President Charles de Gaulle and committed to advocate for a 'yes' vote.

The Caledonien newspaper attacked Governor Aimé Grimald for supporting the 'yes' campaign. Some trade unionists opposed supporting the new constitution, arguing that de Gaulle was aligned with the wealthy.

Results
Voters were asked the question "Do you approve of the Constitution proposed by the Government of the Republic".

References

1958 in New Caledonia
New Caledonia
September 1958 events in Oceania
Referendums in New Caledonia
Constitutional referendums
New Caledonia